Pavel Baskakov (born 28 November 1991) is a Belarusian professional footballer who plays for Kronon Stolbtsy.

References

External links

Profile at teams.by

1991 births
Living people
Belarusian footballers
Association football midfielders
FC BATE Borisov players
FC Kommunalnik Slonim players
FC Vitebsk players
FC Smorgon players
FC Granit Mikashevichi players
FC Luch Minsk (2012) players
FC Uzda players
FC Krumkachy Minsk players
FC Volna Pinsk players